The 2011 Imola Superbike World Championship round was the eleventh round of the 2011 Superbike World Championship. It took place on the weekend of September 23–25, 2011 at Autodromo Enzo e Dino Ferrari, Imola, Italy.

Results

Superbike race 1 classification

Superbike race 2 classification

Supersport race classification

Imola Round
Imola Superbike